Slow Song may refer to:
"Slow Song", a song by Baboon on Ed Lobster
"Slow Song", a song by Sleater-Kinney on their self-titled album
Sentimental ballad

See also
slow dance